São Nicolau (Portuguese meaning Saint Nicholas) is a municipality of the state of Rio Grande do Sul, Brazil. It was founded in 1626 by Jesuit priest Roque González y de Santa Cruz. The population is 5,208 (2020 est.) in an area of 485.32 km². It is located 562 km west of the state capital of Porto Alegre, northeast of Alegrete. The Uruguay River, which forms the border with Argentina, flows along the northwestern part of the municipality. 

The municipality would be partially flooded by the proposed Garabí Dam.

Bounding municipalities

Pirapó
Dezesseis de Novembro
São Luiz Gonzaga
Santo Antônio das Missões
Garruchos

References

External links
http://www.citybrazil.com.br/rs/saonicolau/ 

Municipalities in Rio Grande do Sul